Nedakonice is a municipality and village in Uherské Hradiště District in the Zlín Region of the Czech Republic. It has about 1,600 inhabitants.

Geography

Nedakonice is located in the Lower Morava Valley. It lies on the Dlouhá řeka Stream on the right bank of the Morava River, which forms the eastern border of the municipality.

History
The first written mention of Nedakonice is from 1220. The village was a property of the monastery in Velehrad until its abolition in 1784.

References

Villages in Uherské Hradiště District
Moravian Slovakia